The 1981 Milwaukee Brewers season was the franchise's 13th overall season and 12th season based in Milwaukee. The Brewers finished first in American League East during the second half of the split season (caused by the 1981 Major League Baseball strike) and compiled an overall record of 62 wins and 47 losses. The team advanced to the postseason for the first time in franchise history due to their second-half first-place finish, but lost to the New York Yankees in the American League Division Series. Rollie Fingers became the first relief pitcher in the history of the American League to win the MVP Award.

Offseason 
 December 12, 1980: Sixto Lezcano, David Green, Lary Sorensen and Dave LaPoint were traded by the Brewers to the St. Louis Cardinals for Ted Simmons, Rollie Fingers and Pete Vuckovich.
 January 13, 1981: Ernest Riles was drafted by the Brewers in the 3rd round of the 1981 Major League Baseball draft (Secondary phase).
 February 21, 1981: Paul Hartzell was signed as a free agent by the Brewers.
 March 20, 1981: Bob Galasso was released by the Brewers.

Regular season

Season standings

Record vs. opponents

Notable transactions 
 April 1, 1981: John Poff was traded by the Brewers to the Chicago White Sox for Thad Bosley.
 April 4, 1981: Bill Lyons was released by the Brewers.
 April 5, 1981: Dan Boitano was purchased from the Brewers by the New York Mets from the Milwaukee Brewers.
 June 8, 1981: Bryan Clutterbuck was drafted by the Milwaukee Brewers in the 7th round of the 1981 amateur draft. 
 July 8, 1981: Paul Hartzell was released by the Brewers.

Roster

Player stats

Batting

Starters by position 
Note: Pos = Position; G = Games played; AB = At bats; H = Hits; Avg. = Batting average; HR = Home runs; RBI = Runs batted in

Other batters 
Note: G = Games played; AB = At bats; H = Hits; Avg. = Batting average; HR = Home runs; RBI = Runs batted in

Pitching

Starting pitchers 
Note: G = Games pitched; IP = Innings pitched; W = Wins; L = Losses; ERA = Earned run average; SO = Strikeouts

Relief pitchers 
Note: G = Games pitched; W = Wins; L = Losses; SV = Saves; ERA = Earned run average; SO = Strikeouts

ALDS 

New York wins series, 3-2.

Awards and honors 
 Cecil Cooper, Silver Slugger Award
 Rollie Fingers, American League Cy Young Award
 Rollie Fingers, American League MVP

Farm system

The Brewers' farm system consisted of five minor league affiliates in 1981. The Butte Copper Kings won the Pioneer League championship.

Notes

References 
1981 Milwaukee Brewers team at Baseball-Reference
1981 Milwaukee Brewers at Baseball Almanac

Milwaukee Brewers seasons
Milwaukee Brewers season
Mil